The Galibi Order of Sufism is a descendant of the Qadiriya and Rifa'iya orders – the integration of the earliest and the most popular orders established in Islam. It was known as the Qadiriyyah-Rufai order until the order branched off its ancestor school in 1993, and began to be called after the name of its sheikh, Galip Hasan Kuşçuoğlu. The Order's central dargah is in Ankara and it has various branches throughout Turkey (e.g., Istanbul, Çorum, Adana, Gaziantep, Kütahya, Isparta, Antalya). The Galibi are Hanifi in fiqh and Alevi in disposition.

See also
 Ashurkhana
 Jamatkhana
 Imambargah
 Khalwatkhana
 Khanaqa
 Mejlis
 Musallah
 Hussainia
 Tekkes
 Malamatiyya
 Mawlawiyyah
 Hurufiyya   
 Rifa'iyya
 Qadiriyya
 Qalandariyya
 Bektashiyyah
 Naqshbandiyyah
 Zahediyya
 Khalwatiyya
 Bayramiyya 
 Safaviyya

References

External links
 Galibi Order
 galibindir.net

Sufi orders
Shia Sufi orders